This is a list of former species on the fungal genus Arthopyrenia, with the new species name and family name (or order if still uncertain placement). Also includes species that are now synonyms of accepted Arthopyrenia species.

As accepted by Species Fungorum, (note out of the 355 records list, only 56 are still Arthopyrenia);

A

A. advenula  = Phaeospora triphractoides, Dothideomycetes 
A. advenula var. peregrina]]  = Merismatium peregrinum, Verrucariaceae
A. aeruginella  = Mycoglaena myricae,  Dothideomycetes
A. affinis  = Swinscowia affinis, Strigulaceae
A. aggregata  = Stigmidium aggregatum, Mycosphaerellaceae
A. alba  = Acrocordia gemmata, Monoblastiaceae
A. albida  = Polymeridium albidum, Trypetheliaceae
A. albocinerea  = Polymeridium albocinereum, Trypetheliaceae
A. allogena  = Stigmidium allogenum, Mycosphaerellaceae
A. americana  = Anisomeridium americanum, Monoblastiaceae
A. analepta sensu auct. brit. p.p., = Naetrocymbe punctiformis Naetrocymbaceae
A. analepta var. atomaria  = Leptorhaphis atomaria, Naetrocymbaceae
A. analepta var. fallax  = Pseudosagedia fallax, Porinaceae
A. analepta var. punctiformis  = Naetrocymbe punctiformis, Naetrocymbaceae
A. analepta var. pyrenastrella  = Naetrocymbe punctiformis, Naetrocymbaceae
A. analeptella  = Arthopyrenia analepta, Trypetheliaceae
A. analeptoides  = Mycoporum antecellens, Mycoporaceae
A. angermannica  = Collemopsidium angermannicum, Xanthopyreniaceae
A. anisoloba  = Anisomeridium anisolobum, Monoblastiaceae
A. antecellens  = Mycoporum antecellens, Mycoporaceae
A. apocalypta  = Lasiosphaeriopsis stereocaulicola, Nitschkiaceae
A. apposita  = Bogoriella apposita, Trypetheliaceae
A. arenicola  = Magmopsis argilospila, Ascomycota class
A. areniseda  = Collemopsidium arenisedum, Xanthopyreniaceae
A. argilospila  = Magmopsis argilospila, Ascomycota
A. arthonioides  = Tomasellia arthonioides, Naetrocymbaceae
A. aspiciliae  = Stigmidium aspiciliae, Mycosphaerellaceae
A. atomaria  = Naetrocymbe punctiformis, Naetrocymbaceae
A. atomariella  = Didymella atomariella, Didymellaceae
A. atomarioides  = Naetrocymbe atomarioides, Naetrocymbaceae
A. atractospora  = Naetrocymbe atractospora, Naetrocymbaceae
A. austriaca  = Pseudosagedia austriaca, Porinaceae

B

A. beloniza  = Rhytidiella beloniza, Cucurbitariaceae
A. biformis  = Anisomeridium biforme, Monoblastiaceae
A. bryospila  = Frigidopyrenia bryospila, Ascomycota
A. byssacea  = Anisomeridium biforme, Monoblastiaceae

C

A. caesia  = Collemopsidium caesium, Xanthopyreniaceae
A. calcariae  = Zwackhiomyces calcariae, Xanthopyreniaceae
A. callithrix  = Didymella callithrix, Didymellaceae
A. carinthiaca  = Anisomeridium carinthiacum, Monoblastiaceae
A. carpinea  = Segestria carpinea, Pertusariaceae
A. catapasta  = Polymeridium catapastum,Trypetheliaceae
A. cavata  = Acrocordia cavata, Monoblastiaceae
A. cembrina  = Naetrocymbe punctiformis, Naetrocymbaceae
A. chlorococca  = Normandina acroglypta, Verrucariaceae
A. chlorotica  = Pseudosagedia chlorotica, Porinaceae
A. chlorotica var. carpinea  = Segestria carpinea, Pertusariaceae
A. chlorotica var. olivacea  = Arthopyrenia analepta
A. chlorotica var. persicina  = Segestria persicina, Pertusariaceae
A. cinchonae  = Constrictolumina cinchonae, Trypetheliaceae
A. cinefaciens  = Phylloporis cinefaciens, Strigulaceae
A. cinereopruinosa sensu auct. brit. p.p. (pre-c. 1980) = Anisomeridium ranunculosporum, Monoblastiaceae
A. cinereopruinosa var. galactites  = Arthonia galactites, Arthoniaceae
A. cinereopruinosa var. mezerei  = Arthopyrenia cinereopruinosa
A. cinereopruinosa var. pinicola  = Didymella pinicola, Didymellaceae
A. cinereopruinosa var. stigmatella  = Swinscowia stigmatella, Strigulaceae
A. coepulona  = Zwackhiomyces coepulonus, Xanthopyreniaceae
A. confluens  = Constrictolumina leucostoma, Trypetheliaceae
A. conformis  = Anisomeridium biforme, Monoblastiaceae
A. coniodes  = Sphaerellothecium coniodes, Mycosphaerellaceae
A. conoidea  = Acrocordia conoidea, Monoblastiaceae
A. conoidea f. carnea  = Acrocordia conoidea, Monoblastiaceae
A. consequens  = Pyrenocollema halodytes, Ascomycota
A. consequens var. halodytes  = Pyrenocollema halodytes, Ascomycota
A. consobrina  = Anisomeridium consobrinum, Monoblastiaceae
A. conspurcans  = Zwackhiomyces dispersus, Xanthopyreniaceae
A. contendens  = Polymeridium contendens, Trypetheliaceae
A. cookei  = Muellerella lichenicola, Verrucariaceae
A. corniculata  = Obryzum corniculatum, Obryzaceae
A. cortitecta  = Didymella cortitecta, Didymellaceae
A. coryli  = Pyrenula coryli, Pyrenulaceae
A. crombiei  = Arthopyrenia cerasi

D
A. decolorella  = Cercidospora decolorella, Dothideomycetes
A. diluta  = Pseudopyrenula diluta, Trypetheliaceae
A. dirhyponta  = Didymella dirhyponta, Didymellaceae
A. dispersa  = Zwackhiomyces dispersus, Xanthopyreniaceae

E

A. endobrya  = Acrocordia endobrya, Monoblastiaceae
A. endococcoidea  = Phaeospora rimosicola, Dothideomycetes
A. epicarphinea f. lecaniae  = Stigmidium bellemerei, Mycosphaerellaceae
A. epicymatia  = Stigmidium schaereri, Mycosphaerellaceae
A. epidermidis  = Leptorhaphis epidermidis, Naetrocymbaceae
A. epidermidis b galactites  = Arthonia galactites, Arthoniaceae
A. epidermidis f. cinereopruinosa  = Arthopyrenia cinereopruinosa
A. epidermidis f. fallax  = Pseudosagedia fallax, Porinaceae
A. epidermidis var. albissima  = Leptorhaphis epidermidis, Naetrocymbaceae
A. epidermidis var. analepta  = Arthopyrenia analepta
A. epidermidis var. antecellens  = Mycoporum antecellens, Mycoporaceae
A. epidermidis var. atomaria sensu  = Naetrocymbe punctiformis, Naetrocymbaceae
A. epidermidis var. atomaria  = Leptorhaphis atomaria, Naetrocymbaceae
A. epidermidis var. betularia  = Mycoglaena betularia, Dothideomycetes
A. epidermidis var. cerasi  = Arthopyrenia cerasi
A. epidermidis var. cinerea sensu  = Mycoporum antecellens, Mycoporaceae
A. epidermidis var. cinerea  = Swinscowia stigmatella, Strigulaceae
A. epidermidis var. cinereopruinosa  = Arthopyrenia cinereopruinosa
A. epidermidis var. fallax  = Pseudosagedia fallax, Porinaceae
A. epidermidis var. grisea  = Arthopyrenia grisea
A. epidermidis var. lactea  = Mycoporum lacteum, Mycoporaceae
A. epidermidis var. pluriseptata  = Blastodesmia nitida, Pyrenulaceae
A. epidermidis var. punctiformis  = Naetrocymbe punctiformis, Naetrocymbaceae
A. epidermidis var. pyrenastrella  = Naetrocymbe punctiformis, Naetrocymbaceae
A. epidermidis var. rhyponta  = Naetrocymbe rhyponta, Naetrocymbaceae
A. epigaeoides  = Segestria mammillosa, Pertusariaceae
A. epipolaea f. carnea  = Acrocordia conoidea, Monoblastiaceae
A. epipolytropa  = Cercidospora epipolytropa, Dothideomycetes
A. esenbeckiana  = Constrictolumina esenbeckiana, Trypetheliaceae
A. excellens  = Anisomeridium excellens, Monoblastiaceae
A. exstans  = Anisomeridium subnectendum, Monoblastiaceae

F

A. faginea  = Swinscowia stigmatella, Strigulaceae
A. faginea var. alpestris  = Swinscowia alpestris, Strigulaceae
A. fallax  = Pseudosagedia fallax, Porinaceae
A. fallax f. pinicola  = Didymella pinicola, Didymellaceae
A. finkii  = Acrocordia megalospora, Monoblastiaceae
A. forana var. calcivora  = Thelidium incavatum, Verrucariaceae
A. foveolata  = Collemopsidium foveolatum, Xanthopyreniaceae
A. fraxini  = Naetrocymbe fraxini, Naetrocymbaceae
A. fumago  = Naetrocymbe punctiformis, Naetrocymbaceae
A. fumago  = Naetrocymbe punctiformis, Naetrocymbaceae
A. fuscatae  = Stigmidium fuscatae, Mycosphaerellaceae
A. fuscatae var. olivaceae  = Stigmidium lichenum, Mycosphaerellaceae

G

A. gemmata  = Acrocordia gemmata, Monoblastiaceae
A. geographicicola  = Opegrapha geographicicola, Opegraphaceae
A. glabra  = Swinscowia glabra, Strigulaceae
A. glabrata var. coryli  = Pyrenula coryli, Pyrenulaceae
A. glebarum  = Stigmidium glebarum, Mycosphaerellaceae
A. globularis  = Didymella globularis, Didymellaceae
A. grisea sensu auct. brit., non  = Arthopyrenia cerasi
A. guinetii  = Didymella guinetii, Didymellaceae
A. gyalectoides  = Pyrenocollema halodytes, Ascomycota
A. gyrophorarum  = Stigmidium gyrophorarum, Mycosphaerellaceae

H

A. halizoa  = Verrucaria halizoa, Verrucariaceae
A. halodytes sensu auct. brit. p.p., = Pyrenocollema orustense, Ascomycota
A. halodytes sensu auct. brit. p.p., = Collemopsidium sublitorale, Xanthopyreniaceae
A. halodytes  = Pyrenocollema halodytes, Ascomycota
A. halodytes var. hollii A.L. Sm. (1911)}} = Pyrenocollema halodytes, AscomycotaA. hyalospora  = Lithothelium hyalosporum, PyrenulaceaeA. hygrophila  = [[Zwackhiomyces dispersus); Xanthopyreniaceae
A. hygrophila var. berengeriana  = Zwackhiomyces berengerianus, Xanthopyreniaceae
A. hygrophila var. punctilla  = Stigmidium punctillum, Mycosphaerellaceae

I/J/K
A. inconspicua  = Lichenopeltella inconspicua, Microthyriaceae
A. infernalis  = Megalotremis infernalis, Monoblastiaceae
A. innata  = Stigmidium allogenum, Mycosphaerellaceae
A. kelpii  = Pyrenocollema halodytes, Ascomycota
A. knightii  = Zwackhiomyces socialis, Xanthopyreniaceae

L

A. laburni  = Naetrocymbe punctiformis, Naetrocymbaceae
A. lapponina  = Arthopyrenia analepta
A. latitans  = Didymellopsis latitans, Xanthopyreniaceae
A. lectissima  = Porina lectissima, Pertusariaceae
A. lectissima var. holochrodes  = Porina lectissima, Pertusariaceae
A. lectissima var. leptalea  = Segestria leptalea, Pertusariaceae
A. leptalea  = Segestria leptalea, Pertusariaceae
A. leptotera  = Stigmidium marinum, Mycosphaerellaceae
A. leptotera f. brachyspora  = Stigmidium marinum, Mycosphaerellaceae
A. lichenum  = Stigmidium lichenum, Mycosphaerellaceae
A. lichenum f. fuscatae  = Stigmidium fuscatae, Mycosphaerellaceae
A. lichenum f. olivaceae  = Stigmidium lichenum, Mycosphaerellaceae
A. limitans  = Anisomeridium americanum, Monoblastiaceae
A. linearis  = Pseudosagedia linearis, Porinaceae
A. litoralis sensu auct. brit. = Collemopsidium sublitorale, Xanthopyreniaceae
A. litoralis var. leptotera  = Stigmidium marinum, Mycosphaerellaceae
A. lomnitzensis  = Sagediopsis lomnitzensis, Adelococcaceae
A. lucens  = Pseudosagedia lucens, Porinaceae
A. lyrata  = Macroconstrictolumina lyrata, Trypetheliaceae

M

A. macrospora  = Acrocordia macrospora, Monoblastiaceae
A. macrospora  = Acrocordia megalospora, Monoblastiaceae
A. macrospora  = Arthopyrenia agasthiensis
A. macularis var. codonoidea  = Pseudosagedia aenea, Porinaceae
A. macularis var. fusiformis  = Verrucaria fusiformis, Verrucariaceae
A. macularis var. trachona  = Aquacidia trachona, Byssolomataceae
A. majuscula  = Macroconstrictolumina majuscula, Trypetheliaceae
A. malaccitula  = Macroconstrictolumina malaccitula, Trypetheliaceae
A. marina  = Stigmidium marinum, Mycosphaerellaceae
A. marina f. tenuicula  = Stigmidium marinum, Mycosphaerellaceae
A. megalospora  = Naetrocymbe megalospora, Naetrocymbaceae
A. mesotropa  = Thelidium minutulum, Verrucariaceae
A. microspila  = Stigmidium microspilum, Mycosphaerellaceae
A. microspila f. pertusariae  = Stigmidium microspilum, Mycosphaerellaceae
A. monensis  = Collemopsidium monense, Xanthopyreniaceae
A. mycoporoides  = Mycoporum mycoporoides, Mycoporaceae
A. myricae  = Mycoglaena myricae, Dothideomycetes

N/O

A. neesii  = Massarina neesii, Massarinaceae
A. nitescens  = Naetrocymbe nitescens, Naetrocymbaceae
A. nitida  = Pyrenula nitida, Pyrenulaceae
A. nitida var. nitidella  = Pyrenula nitidella, Pyrenulaceae
A. nylanderi  = Thelidium nylanderi, Verrucariaceae
A. obscura  = Mycoporellum obscurum, Mycoporaceae
A. obtecta  = Lithothelium obtectum, Pyrenulaceae
A. oculata  = Polymeridium sulphurescens, Trypetheliaceae
A. olivacea sensu auct. brit., = Pseudosagedia borreri, Porinaceae
A. olivacea  = Pseudosagedia borreri, Porinaceae
A. olivacea  = Arthopyrenia analepta
A. orustensis  = Pyrenocollema orustense, Ascomycota
A. oxyspora  = Leptorhaphis epidermidis, Naetrocymbaceae
A. oxyspora var. tremulae  = Leptorhaphis tremulae, Naetrocymbaceae

P

A. padi  = Naetrocymbe punctiformis, Naetrocymbaceae
A. papularis  = Thelidium papulare, Verrucariaceae
A. pelvetiae  = Pyrenocollema pelvetiae, Ascomycota
A. perexigua  = Mycoporellum perexiguum, Mycoporaceae
A. persicina  = Segestria persicina, Pertusariaceae
A. persoonii  = Naetrocymbe punctiformis, Naetrocymbaceae
A. persoonii f. atomaria  = Leptorhaphis atomaria, Naetrocymbaceae
A. persoonii f. salicis  = Arthopyrenia salicis
A. persoonii var. fraxini  = Naetrocymbe fraxini, Naetrocymbaceae
A. persoonii var. juglandis  = Naetrocymbe punctiformis, Naetrocymbaceae
A. persoonii var. proteiformis  = Naetrocymbe punctiformis, Naetrocymbaceae
A. persoonii var. punctiformis  = Naetrocymbe punctiformis, Naetrocymbaceae
A. phaeosporizans  = Mycoporopsis phaeosporizans, Dothideomycetidae
A. picea  = Astrosphaeriella picea, Astrosphaeriellaceae
A. pinicola  = Didymella pinicola, Didymellaceae
A. pithyophila  = Mycoporopsis pithyophila, Dothideomycetidae
A. planorbis  = Constrictolumina planorbis, Trypetheliaceae
A. pluriseptata  = Blastodesmia nitida, Pyrenulaceae
A. porocyphi  = Pharcidia porocyphi, Mycosphaerellaceae
A. porospora  = Constrictolumina porospora, Trypetheliaceae
A. proteiformis  = Naetrocymbe punctiformis, Naetrocymbaceae
A. psorae  = Stigmidium allogenum, Mycosphaerellaceae
A. punctiformis sensu  = Arthopyrenia salicis
A. punctiformis sensu  = Arthopyrenia carneobrunneola
A. punctiformis sensu  = Naetrocymbe nitescens, Naetrocymbaceae
A. punctiformis  = Naetrocymbe punctiformis, Naetrocymbaceae
A. punctiformis a fallax  = Pseudosagedia fallax, Porinaceae
A. punctiformis b analepta  (= Arthopyrenia analepta
A. punctiformis f. analepta sensu auct. brit. p.p. = Naetrocymbe punctiformis, Naetrocymbaceae
A. punctiformis f. analepta  = Arthopyrenia analepta
A. punctiformis f. globularis  = Didymella globularis, Didymellaceae
A. punctiformis f. rhododendri  = Naetrocymbe rhododendri, Naetrocymbaceae
A. punctiformis f. salicis  = Arthopyrenia salicis
A. punctiformis subsp. fallax  = Pseudosagedia fallax, Porinaceae
A. punctiformis subsp. globularis  = Didymella globularis, Didymellaceae
A. punctiformis var. analepta  = Arthopyrenia analepta
A. punctiformis var. atomaria  = Leptorhaphis atomaria, Naetrocymbaceae
A. punctiformis var. cinereopruinosa  = Arthopyrenia cinereopruinosa
A. punctiformis var. fallax  = Pseudosagedia fallax, Porinaceae
A. punctiformis var. fraxini  = Naetrocymbe fraxini, Naetrocymbaceae
A. punctiformis var. juglandis  = Naetrocymbe punctiformis, Naetrocymbaceae
A. punctiformis var. pyrenastrella  = Naetrocymbe punctiformis, Naetrocymbaceae
A. punctiformis var. rhyponta  = Naetrocymbe rhyponta, Naetrocymbaceae
A. punctillum  = Stigmidium punctillum, Mycosphaerellaceae
A. pycnostigma  = Leptosphaeria pycnostigma, Leptosphaeriaceae
A. pyrenastrella  = Naetrocymbe punctiformis, Naetrocymbaceae
A. pyrenuloides  = Polymeridium pyrenuloides, Trypetheliaceae

Q/R

A. quassiicola  = Naetrocymbe quassiicola, Naetrocymbaceae
A. quercus  = Cyrtidula quercus, Dothideomycetes
A. quinqueseptata  = Polymeridium quinqueseptatum, Trypetheliaceae
A. ramalinae  = Stigmidium ramalinae, Mycosphaerellaceae
A. ranunculospora  = Anisomeridium ranunculosporum, Monoblastiaceae
A. rappii  = Mycoporopsis rappii, Dothideomycetidae
A. rhaphispora  = Porina rhaphispora, Pertusariaceae
A. rhyponta sensu auct. brit. p.p. = Naetrocymbe punctiformis, Naetrocymbaceae
A. rhyponta sensu auct. brit. p.p. = Stigmidium microspilum, Mycosphaerellaceae
A. rhyponta  = Naetrocymbe rhyponta, Naetrocymbaceae
A. rhyponta f. rhypontella  = Didymella rhypontella, Didymellaceae
A. rhyponta var. fumago  = Naetrocymbe punctiformis, Naetrocymbaceae
A. rhypontella  = Didymella rhypontella, Didymellaceae
A. rivulorum  = Stigmidium rivulorum, Mycosphaerellaceae

S

A. salweyi  = Acrocordia salweyi, Monoblastiaceae
A. sanfordensis var. cedrina  = Naetrocymbe cedrina, Naetrocymbaceae
A. saxicola  = Naetrocymbe saxicola, Naetrocymbaceae
A. siamensis  = Polymeridium siamense, Trypetheliaceae
A. socialis  = Zwackhiomyces socialis, Xanthopyreniaceae
A. sphaeroides sensu auct. brit. = Acrocordia gemmata, Monoblastiaceae
A. sprucei f. verrucosa  = Polyblastia verrucosa, Verrucariaceae
A. sprucei var. pyrenophora  = Thelidium pyrenophorum, Verrucariaceae
A. stigmatella sensu  = Mycoporum antecellens, Mycoporaceae
A. stigmatella  = Swinscowia stigmatella, Strigulaceae
A. stigmatella  = Mycoporum antecellens, Mycoporaceae
A. stramineoatra  = Polymeridium stramineoatrum, Trypetheliaceae
A. strontianensis  = Collemopsidium angermannicum, Xanthopyreniaceae
A. subareniseda  = Collemopsidium subarenisedum, Xanthopyreniaceae
A. subglobosa  = Acrocordia subglobosa, Monoblastiaceae
A. sublitoralis  = Collemopsidium sublitorale, Xanthopyreniaceae
A. sublitoralis f. foveolata  = Collemopsidium foveolatum, Xanthopyreniaceae
A. submicans  = Naetrocymbe nitescens, Naetrocymbaceae
A. submuriformis  = Swinscowia submuriformis, Strigulaceae
A. subnectenda  = Anisomeridium subnectendum, Monoblastiaceae
A. subnexa  = Anisomeridium subnexum, Monoblastiaceae
A. suboculata  = Polymeridium sulphurescens, Trypetheliaceae
A. subprostans  = Anisomeridium subprostans, Monoblastiaceae
A. suffusa  = Polymeridium suffusum, Trypetheliaceae
A. sulphurescens  = Polymeridium sulphurescens, Trypetheliaceae
A. superposita  = Stigmidium superpositum, Mycosphaerellaceae

T/U/V/W

A. tartarina  = Sagediopsis campsteriana, Adelococcaceae
A. taylorii  = Dichoporis taylorii, Strigulaceae
A. tenuis  = Dichoporis tenuis, Strigulaceae
A. terminata  = Anisomeridium terminatum, Monoblastiaceae
A. tichothecioides  = Pyrenocollema tichothecioides, Ascomycota
A. tremulae  = Leptorhaphis tremulae, Naetrocymbaceae
A. ungeri  = Thelidium pyrenophorum, Verrucariaceae
A. verrucosaria  = Cercidospora verrucosaria, Dothideomycetes
A. viridescens  = Anisomeridium viridescens, Monoblastiaceae
A. viridula sensu A.L. Smith}} = Verrucaria elaeina, VerrucariaceaeA. viridula  = Verrucaria viridula, VerrucariaceaeA. willeyana  = Anisomeridium polypori'', Monoblastiaceae

References

Arthopyrenia
Pleosporales